"Take a Chance" is a song by Swedish singer Robin Bengtsson. The song was performed for the first time in Melodifestivalen 2020, where it made it to the final. It was released as a digital download in Sweden on 22 February 2020 by Universal. The song peaked at number 13 on the Swedish single chart.

Track listing

Charts

Release date

References

2020 singles
English-language Swedish songs
Melodifestivalen songs of 2020
Robin Bengtsson songs
2020 songs